Granville George Leveson-Gower, 2nd Earl Granville,  (11 May 181531 March 1891), styled Lord Leveson until 1846, was a British Liberal statesman and diplomat from the Leveson-Gower family. He is best remembered for his service as Secretary of State for Foreign Affairs.

His foreign policy was based on patience, peace, and no alliances; it kept Britain free from European wars and improved relations with the United States after the strain during the American Civil War.

Background and education
Leveson-Gower was born in London, the eldest son of Granville Leveson-Gower, 1st Earl Granville and Lady Harriet Cavendish, daughter of Lady Georgiana Spencer and William Cavendish, 5th Duke of Devonshire. His father was a younger son of Granville Leveson-Gower, 1st Marquess of Stafford and his third wife; an elder son with his second wife (a daughter of the 1st Duke of Bridgwater) became the 2nd Marquess of Stafford, and his marriage with the daughter and heiress of the 18th Earl of Sutherland (Countess of Sutherland in her own right) led to the merging of the Gower and Stafford titles in that of the Dukes of Sutherland (created 1833), who represent the elder branch of the family. He was educated at Eton and Christ Church, Oxford.

Political career
Leveson-Gower went to Paris for a short time under his father, and in 1836 was elected to Parliament as Whig MP for Morpeth. For a short time (1840-1) he was Under-Secretary of State for Foreign Affairs in Lord Melbourne's ministry. From 1841 until his father's death in 1846, when he succeeded to the title, he sat for Lichfield.

In the House of Lords he distinguished himself as a Free Trader, and when Lord John Russell formed a government in 1846 he made him Master of the Buckhounds. He became Vice-President of the Board of Trade in 1848, and took a prominent part in promoting the Great Exhibition of 1851. Having already been admitted to the Cabinet, for about two months at the end of 1851 and the start of 1852 he succeeded Palmerston as Foreign Secretary until Russell's defeat in 1852.

When Lord Aberdeen formed his coalition government at the end of 1852, Granville became first Lord President of the Council, and then Chancellor of the Duchy of Lancaster (1854). Under Lord Palmerston (1855) he was again President of the Council. His interest in education (a subject associated with this office) led to his election (1856) as chancellor of the University of London, a post he held for thirty-five years; and he was a prominent champion of the movement for the admission of women, and also of the teaching of modern languages.

From 1855 Lord Granville led the Liberals in the Upper House, both in office and, after Palmerston's resignation in 1858, in opposition. In 1856 he was head of the British mission to Tsar Alexander II of Russia's coronation in Moscow. In June 1859 Queen Victoria asked him to form a ministry, but he was unable to do so, and Palmerston again became Prime Minister, with Russell as Foreign Secretary and Granville once again as President of the Council.

He received an honorary degree from Cambridge University in 1864. He retained his office when, on Palmerston's death in 1865, Lord Russell (now a peer) became Prime Minister and took over the leadership in the House of Lords. Granville, now an established Liberal leader, was made Lord Warden of the Cinque Ports. As Lord Warden, he was appointed Honorary Colonel of the 1st Cinque Ports Artillery Volunteers on 23 April 1866.

Industrial career
Lord Granville owned coal and ironstone mines at Stoke-on-Trent and was the principal shareholder of the Shelton Iron & Steel Co In 1873 the company operated 8 blast furnaces and 97 puddling furnaces. He also held shares in the Lilleshall Company.

Foreign policy

During the American Civil War, Granville was non-interventionist along with the majority of Palmerston's cabinet. His memorandum against intervention in September 1862 drew Prime Minister Palmerston's attention. The document proved to be a strong reason for Palmerston's refusal to intervene and for Britain's relations with the North to remain basically stable for the rest of the conflict despite tensions. From 1866 to 1868, he was in opposition, but in December 1868 he became Colonial Secretary in Gladstone's first ministry. His tact was invaluable to the government in carrying the Irish Church and Land Bills through the House of Lords. On 27 June 1870, on Lord Clarendon's death, he became foreign secretary. With war clouds gathering in Europe, Granville worked to authorise preliminary talks to settle American disputes and in appointing the British High Commission to sail to the United States and negotiate the most comprehensive treaty of the nineteenth century in Anglo-American relations with an American commission in Washington.

Lord Granville's name is mainly associated with his career as foreign secretary (1870–1874 and 1880–1885). His Gladstonian foreign policy based on patience, peace, and no alliances kept Britain free from European wars. It brought better relations with the United States, and it was innovative in supporting Gladstone's wish to settle British-American fisheries and Civil War disputes over the Confederate cruisers built in Britain, like the Alabama, through international arbitration in 1872. For example, the long-standing San Juan Island Water Boundary Dispute in Puget Sound, which had been left ambiguous in the Oregon Treaty of 1846 to salve relations and get a treaty sorting out the primary differences, was arbitrated by the German Emperor also in 1872. In putting British-American relations up to the world as a model for how to resolve disputes peacefully, Granville helped create a breakthrough in international relations.

The Franco-Prussian War of 1870 broke out within a few days of Lord Granville's quoting in the House of Lords (11 July 1870) the opinion of the permanent under-secretary (Edmund Hammond) that "he had never known so great a lull in foreign affairs."  Russia took advantage of the situation to denounce the Black Sea clauses of the Treaty of Paris, and Lord Granville's protest was ineffectual. In 1871 an intermediate zone between Asiatic Russia and Afghanistan was agreed on between him and Shuvalov; but in 1873 Russia took possession of the Khanate of Khiva, within the neutral zone, and Lord Granville had to accept the aggression (See also: The Great Game).

When the Conservatives came into power in 1874, his part for the next six years was to criticise Disraeli's "spirited" foreign policy, and to defend his own more pliant methods. He returned to the foreign office in 1880, only to find an anti-British spirit developing in German policy which the temporising methods of the Liberal leaders were generally powerless to deal with.

Lord Granville failed to realise in time the importance of the Angra Pequena question in 1883–1884, and he was forced, somewhat ignominiously, to yield to Bismarck over it. Finally, when Gladstone took up Home Rule for Ireland, Lord Granville, whose mind was similarly receptive to new ideas, adhered to his chief (1886), and gave way to Lord Rosebery when the latter was preferred to the foreign office; the Liberals had now realised that they had lost ground in the country by Lord Granville's occupancy of the post. He went into Colonial Office service for six months, and in July 1886 retired from public life.

Family
Lord Granville married Lady Acton (Marie Louise Pelline de Dalberg), daughter of Emmerich Joseph de Dalberg, widow of Sir Ferdinand Dalberg-Acton, Bt, and mother of the historian Lord Acton, in 1840. She died in 1860.

He was engaged in 1864 to an envoy and former spy from the Confederate States of America, Rose O'Neal Greenhow; but shortly thereafter, in returning to the Confederacy, she drowned off Wilmington, North Carolina, when her rowboat overturned as she was escaping a US blockade ship.

He married, as his second wife, Castilia Rosalind Campbell (or Castalia), daughter of Walter Frederick Campbell, on 26 September 1865; their children were:

Lady Victoria Alberta Leveson-Gower (14 April 186711 February 1953), married Harold Russell (son of Lord Arthur John Edward Russell) on 8 September 1896. They had three children:
Elizabeth Frances Russell (6 July 18991986)
Rachel Georgiana Russell (28 January 19031 December 1995)
Anthony Arthur Russell (2 October 19047 April 1978)
Lady Sophia Castelia Mary Leveson-Gower (25 February 187022 March 1934), married Hugh Morrison on 16 August 1892. They had two children:
John Granville Morrison, 1st Baron Margadale (16 December 190626 May 1996), married The Honorable Margaret Smith on 16 October 1928. They had four children. 
Marjorie Morrison (15 December 19101992), married Lt.-Col. Scrope Egerton on 16 January 1933. They had one daughter:
Susan Alexandra Egerton (born 1936)
Granville Leveson-Gower, 3rd Earl Granville (4 March 187221 July 1939), married Nina Baring (granddaughter of Francis Baring, 1st Baronet on 27 September 1900.
Lady Susan Katherine Leveson-Gower (21 August 18767 May 1878) 
Vice-Admiral William Spencer Leveson-Gower, 4th Earl Granville (11 July 188025 June 1953), married Lady Rose Bowes-Lyon on 24 May 1916. They had two children.

Death
Granville died in London on 31 March 1891 and was succeeded in his peerages by his elder son, who became the 3rd Earl. He was buried in the family vault in the churchyard of St Michael and St Wulfad, Stone, Staffordshire.

Legacy

Granville was the name of the present Canadian city of Vancouver from 1870 until its incorporation in 1886.  Granville Street is a major north–south thoroughfare in the city.
 Granville house at Epsom College was named in his honour.
Granville is also the name of a suburb and train station in Sydney. It was named in 1880.
Granville Road, Granville Square and Granville Circuit in Hong Kong are named after him.
 Granville Hotel Ramsgate (designed by Edward Welby Pugin) named after him The Granville Hotel, Ramsgate .

See also
 Timeline of British diplomatic history

References

Bibliography
 Cecil, Algernon. British Foreign Secretaries 1807-1916 (1927) pp 255–273. online
 Chamberlain, Muriel E. "Gower, Granville George Leveson-, second Earl Granville (1815–1891)", Oxford Dictionary of National Biography, Oxford University Press, 2004; online edn, Jan 2008 accessed 20 Feb 2012
 Petty-Fitzmaurice, Edmond George. The life of Granville George Leveson Gower: second earl Granville (2 vol 1905) full text online
 
 The Gladstone-Granville Correspondence ed. by Agatha Ramm, (2 vol, 1952, 1962)
 Temperley, Harold and L.M. Penson, eds. Foundations of British Foreign Policy: From Pitt (1792) to Salisbury (1902) (1938), primary sources online

Attribution:

External links

 
 
 

1815 births
1891 deaths
Alumni of Christ Church, Oxford
British Secretaries of State
British Secretaries of State for Foreign Affairs
Chancellors of the Duchy of Lancaster
Chancellors of the University of London
Earls Granville
English ironmasters
Fellows of the Royal Society
Knights of the Garter
Leaders of the House of Lords
Leaders of the Liberal Party (UK)
Leveson-Gower family
Lord Presidents of the Council
Lords Warden of the Cinque Ports
Masters of the Buckhounds
Members of the Parliament of the United Kingdom for English constituencies
Members of the Privy Council of the United Kingdom
Military personnel from London
Non-interventionism
People educated at Eton College
Secretaries of State for the Colonies
UK MPs 1837–1841
UK MPs 1841–1847
UK MPs who inherited peerages
Whig (British political party) MPs for English constituencies
19th-century English businesspeople